Ben Amed Djibril Zidnaba (born 20 February 1994 in Ouagadougou) is a Burkinabé footballer who last played for Sport Benfica e Castelo Branco, as a defensive midfielder.

Career
In January 2013, Zidnaba signed for Associação Naval 1º de Maio.

References

External links
 
 

1994 births
Living people
Sportspeople from Ouagadougou
Burkinabé footballers
Association football midfielders
Burkinabé expatriate footballers
Liga Portugal 2 players
Primeira Liga players
Étoile Filante de Ouagadougou players
Associação Naval 1º de Maio players
S.C. Braga B players
Moreirense F.C. players
F.C. Penafiel players
Sertanense F.C. players
C.D. Trofense players
Sport Benfica e Castelo Branco players
Expatriate footballers in Portugal
Burkinabé expatriate sportspeople in Portugal
21st-century Burkinabé people